John Petherick (1813 – 15 July 1882), was a Welsh traveller, trader and consul in East Central Africa.

Life
He was born in Glamorganshire, and adopted the profession of mining engineer.

In 1845 he entered the service of Mehemet Ali, and was employed in examining Upper Egypt, Nubia, the Red Sea coast and Kordofan in an unsuccessful search for coal.

In 1848 Petherick left the Egyptian service and established himself at El Obeid, the capital of Kordofan, as a trader, dealing largely in gum arabic. He was at the same time made British consular agent for the Sudan. In 1853 he moved again to Khartoum and became an ivory trader. He travelled extensively in the Bahr-el-Ghazal region, then almost unknown, exploring the Jur River, Yalo and other affluents of the Bahr el Ghazal river.

In 1858 he penetrated to the Niam-Niam country. His additions to the knowledge of natural history were considerable. Petherick returned to England in 1859 where he made the acquaintance of JH Speke, then arranging for his expedition to discover the source of the Nile. While in England Petherick married, and published an account of his travels.

He returned to the Sudan in 1861, accompanied by his wife and with the rank of consul. He was entrusted with a mission by the Royal Geographical Society to convey to Gondokoro relief stores for captains Speke and Grant. Petherick got boats to Gondokoro in 1862, but Speke and Grant had not arrived. Having arranged for a native force to proceed south to get in touch with the absentees, a task successfully accomplished, Mr and Mrs Petherick undertook another journey in the Bahr-el-Ghazal, making important collections of plants and fishes. They regained Gondokoro (where one of their boats with stores was already stationed) in February 1863, four days after the arrival of Speke and Grant, who had meantime accepted the hospitality of Mr (afterwards Sir) Samuel Baker. Speke later publicly accused Petherick of failing to fulfill his commitment.

Speke and members of the white community in Khartoum also accused Petherick of involvement in the slave trade. In this the Europeans may perversely have been motivated by Petherick's interference in their commercial activities; slavery was deeply entwined with the local economy. Petherick's own business involved collaboration with slavers; he also made some efforts to disrupt slave trading. Despite or because of the complex reality Earl Russell, then secretary for foreign affairs, abolished the British consulate at Khartoum in 1864. Petherick's reputation and finances were badly damaged.

In 1865 the Pethericks returned to England, and in 1869 published Travels in Central Africa and Explorations of the Western Nile Tributaries, in which he set out the details of the Speke controversy.

Petherick died in London on 15 July 1882.

References

Sources

1813 births
1882 deaths
Welsh explorers
Explorers of Africa